Stratham is a town in Rockingham County, New Hampshire, United States. The town had a population of 7,669 at the 2020 census. It is bounded on the west by the Squamscott River. The town is the home of the only U.S. Lindt & Sprüngli factory and the headquarters of the Timberland Corporation.

History 

Stratham was settled in 1631 and incorporated in 1716. The area, called Winnicutt by the Pennacook people, was known as "Squamscott Patent" or "Point of Rocks" because of its location between Great Bay and the Squamscott River. The sixth town in the colony to be incorporated, the town was named for Wriothesley Russell, Baron Howland of Streatham, a friend of New Hampshire Royal Governor Samuel Shute.

The town is unusual among New England settlements of its size in having been comprehensively mapped in 1793 by Phinehas Merrill. It is therefore possible to identify how many of the extant buildings of the town predate the map.

Each summer since 1967, the town hosts the Stratham Fair, held at Stratham Hill Park. However, the fair was canceled two years in a row (2020 and 2021) due to the COVID-19 pandemic.

Geography
Most of Stratham is drained by the Squamscott River, a north-flowing tributary of Great Bay. The east side of the town drains to the Winnicut River, which also flows to Great Bay. The entire town is part of the Piscataqua River watershed.

Stratham Hill Park and nearby Gordon Barker Town Forest offer a combined trail system for hikers and mountain bikers.

Stratham is crossed by New Hampshire Routes 33, 108 and 111. Additionally, the New Hampshire Route 101 expressway passes through the southern portion of town.

Adjacent municipalities
 Greenland, New Hampshire (northeast)
 North Hampton, New Hampshire (southeast)
 Exeter, New Hampshire (southwest)
 Newfields, New Hampshire (west)
 Newmarket, New Hampshire (northwest)

Demographics

As of the 2020 census, the population of Stratham was 7,669 people and 2,886 households. The 2010 census showed 2,045 families residing in the town. The population density was 507.8 people per square mile (196.1/km). As of 2010, there were 2,864 housing units at an average density of 189.7 per square mile (73.2/km). The racial makeup of the town as of 2020 was 96.4% White, 5.4% Asian, 0.1% some other race, and 1.1% from two or more races. Hispanic or Latino of any race were 0.6% of the population. African-American, Native Hawaiian or Pacific Islander, and Native American resperesented 0% of the population, accord to the 2020 census data.

The 2010 census showed hat there were 2,746 households in Sttratham, out of which 37.7% had children under the age of 18 living with them, 64.0% were headed by married couples living together, 7.6% had a female householder with no husband present, and 25.5% were non-families. 20.4% of all households were made up of individuals, and 6.6% were someone living alone who was 65 years of age or older. The average household size was 2.64, and the average family size was 3.08.

In the town, the population was spread out, with 26.4% under the age of 18, 5.0% from 18 to 24, 22.2% from 25 to 44, 34.9% from 45 to 64, and 11.6% who were 65 years of age or older. The median age was 43.3 years. For every 100 females, there were 95.0 males. For every 100 females age 18 and over, there were 91.4 males.

For the period 2016–2020, the estimated median annual income for a household in the town was $126,009. Male full-time workers had a median income of $102,315 versus $56,750 for females. As of 2020, the per capita income for the town was $62,776, while 2.4% of the population were below the poverty line.

Public safety
Stratham has an all-volunteer fire department located in a new building at the intersection of Winnicut Road and Portsmouth Avenue (NH 33) next to the Stratham Historical Society. 

The Stratham Police Department is located at 76 Portsmouth Avenue. The department has 12 full-time officers, one part-time officer, one prosecutor and one full-time administrative assistant. According to their website, the "Stratham Police are very community oriented and are involved in several events such as National Night Out, Coffee With a Cop, Bike Rodeos, Family Fun Day, and many others."

Education

Stratham is home to two schools: the Cooperative Middle School and Stratham Memorial School. Stratham Memorial School is located at 39 Gifford Farm Road and teaches from Pre-K to 5th grade. The Cooperative Middle School (CMS) is located at 100 Academic Way and includes grades 6–8. High school students from Stratham attend Exeter High School (grades 9–12). The public elementary only serve students from Stratham, while the high school and middle school serves students from all six towns of SAU 16—in which Stratham is the second-largest town, after Exeter and ahead of Brentwood, Kensington, East Kingston, and Newfields.

Notable people 

 David Barker Jr. (1797–1834), US congressman
 Josiah Bartlett Jr. (1768–1838), physician, US congressman
 Daniel Clark (1809–1891), US senator
 Maurice J. Murphy Jr. (1927–2002), US senator 
 Thomas Wiggin (1601–1666), first governor of the Upper Plantation of New Hampshire which eventually became the Royal Province of New Hampshire in 1741 
 Paine Wingate (1739–1838), served in the Continental Congress; US senator, congressman

References

External links

 
 Wiggin Memorial Library
 Stratham Historical Society – includes Merrill's 1793 Plan
 Stratham Fair
 New Hampshire Economic and Labor Market Information Bureau Profile

 
Towns in Rockingham County, New Hampshire
Towns in New Hampshire
1716 establishments in New Hampshire